ZESCO United Football Club (simply often known as ZESCO) is a Zambian professional football club based in Ndola in Zambia, that competes in the Zambia Super League, Founded in 1974. The team plays its home matches at the Levy Mwanawasa Stadium.

The club is wholly owned and sponsored by the state owned electricity supplier ZESCO.

History and records
ZESCO United was founded in 1974. They became the first Zambian club to qualify for the CAF African Champions League Group stage in 2009. ZESCO United are one of only 3 Zambian clubs including Nkana and Green Buffaloes who hold an all time unbeaten home record against non Zambian opposition. ZESCO United also became the first Zambian Club this century to play against European opposition when they played against Zenit Saint Petersburg in Abu Dhabi in 2008.

They reached their first ever semi finals of the CAF African Champions League after a 2–2 draw away to Egyptian league champions Al Ahly in Matchday 5 of the Champions' League quarter final group stage.

They extended their all time unbeaten home record against non Zambian teams to 26 games on Saturday, 17 September 2016, after a 2–1 home win against South African league champions Mamelodi Sundowns in the CAF African Champions League.

The club also created history by being the first Zambian club to sign Asian players, with Kosuke Nakamachi from Japan.

Achievements
Zambian Premier League: 9
2007, 2008, 2010, 2014, 2015, 2017, 2018, 2019, 2021
Runner up : 2005, 2009, 2013, 2016

ABSA Cup: 6
2007, 2008, 2010, 2014, 2016, 2019
Finalist : 2021

Zambian Charity Shield: 5
2007, 2011, 2015, 2017, 2021

Zambian Cup: 1
2006
Finalist : 2007

Zambian Coca-Cola Cup: 1
2007

Zambian Division One: 2
1980, 2003

Performance in CAF competitions
CAF Champions League: 9 appearances
2008 – Last 32
2009 – Group stage (Top 8)
2011 – Last 16
2015 – Last 32
2016 – Semi-finals
2018 – Group stage (Top 16)
2019 - First Round
2020 - Group stage (Top 16)
2022 - Preliminary round

CAF Confederation Cup: 6 appearances
2006 – First Round
2010 – First Round
2013 – Last 16
2014 – Second round
2017 – Quarter-finals
2019 – Group stage (Top 16)

Players

Current squad
As of 3 May 2021.

Former players

  Marcel Kalonda

References

External links

Football clubs in Zambia
Association football clubs established in 1974
Ndola
1974 establishments in Zambia